Groovin' is the third studio album by Bill Wyman's Rhythm Kings. It reached No 1 in the UK Jazz and Blues Chart.

Track listing
 "Tell You a Secret" (Bill Wyman, Terry Taylor) – 3:04
 "Groovin'" (Eddie Brigati, Felix Cavaliere) – 3:31
 "Rough Cut Diamond" (Wyman, Taylor) – 4:05
 "Mood Swing" (Keith Sewell, Nial Toner, Wendy Buckner) – 4:09
 "Hole in the Wall" (Wyman, Taylor) – 3:10
 "Can't Get My Rest at Night" (J. David Ray) – 3:46
 "I Put a Spell on You" (Jay Hawkins) – 4:06
 "Tomorrow Night" (Wyman) – 5:00
 "I Want to Be Evil" (Judson, Taylor) – 2:32
 "Rhythm King" (Georgie Fame) – 4:52
 "Daydream" (John Sebastian) – 4:10
 "Oh! Baby" (Barbara Linda Ozen) – 3:56
 "Streamline Woman" (Wyman, Taylor) – 2:53
 "Yesterdays" (Jerome Kern, Otto Harbach) – 4:27

Personnel

Musicians
 Bill Wyman – bass
 Terry Taylor – lead guitar (track 6), rhythm guitar (tracks 1, 3–5, 7-10, 12, 14), acoustic guitar (tracks 2, 11, 13)  
 Graham Broad – drums (all tracks except track 4)
 Ray Cooper – percussion (tracks 1–5, 7–8, 10–11, 13)
 Albert Lee – lead guitar (tracks 4, 10, 12-13), lead vocals (track 4)
 Martin Taylor – lead guitar (tracks 2, 7, 9, 13)
 Mick Taylor – lead guitar (track 8), slide guitar (track 6)
 Andy Fairweather Low – lead-guitar (track 1)
 Tommy Emmanuel – lead guitar (tracks 5, 11), slide guitar (track 3), acoustic guitar (tracks 2, 10, 13), rhythm guitar (track 9) 
 Georgie Fame – organ (tracks 2, 8, 10-13), lead vocals (tracks 3, 6, 8, 10), piano (tracks 5, 7)
 Dave Hartley – piano (tracks 2–4, 8–9, 11–12, 14)
 Gary Brooker – piano (track 10), organ (track 7), lead vocals (tracks 5, 11)
 Nick Payn – harmonica (track 1), horns (tracks 1–3, 5, 8-13)
 Frank Mead – horns (tracks 1–3, 5, 7-13)
 Henry Spinetti – drums (track 4)
 Jerry Portnoy – harmonica (track 3)
 Chris Hall – accordion (track 4)
 Gerry Hogan – pedal steel guitar (track 4)
 Anthony Kerr – vibraphone [vibes] (track 8)
 Eddie Hession – accordion (track 9)
 Beverley Skeete – lead vocals (tracks 2, 7, 9, 12, 14), backing vocals
 Adrian Byron Burns – lead vocals (track 1)
 Anita Kelsey, Sara Skeete, Janice Hoyte, Keeley Coburn, Melanie Redmond, Susie Webb, Zoe Nicholas – backing vocals

Technical
 Bill Wyman – producer, arrangements
 Terry Taylor – producer
 Nick Payn – horn arrangements
 Brian Tench – mixing engineer
 Stuart Epps – engineer
 Tim Young – mastering engineer
 Russ Kane – liner notes

References

External links
 
 Bill Wyman's Rhythm Kings – Groovin' (2000, CD)

Bill Wyman's Rhythm Kings albums
2000 albums
Roadrunner Records albums